Mateo Palacios Corazzina (born 25 March 2002), better known by the stage name Trueno, is an Argentine rapper and singer from La Boca, Buenos Aires. He is best known for his appearance in the freestyle session "BZRP Freestyle Sessions # 6" in collaboration with Bizarrap, which managed to exceed 140,000,000 views on YouTube and currently holds the record for being the most viewed freestyle video on that site.

Early years
Mateo was born on 25 March 2002 in the neighborhood of La Boca in Buenos Aires, Argentina. From a very young age he showed his love for rap, one of his great influences would be the American rapper Tupac Shakur, Dr. Dre, Snoop Dogg. He is the son of Argentine rapper MC Peligro, who is recognized for having won multiple freestyle competitions, who is also a great reference for Trueno to dedicate himself to freestyle since he stated that he wanted to be a soccer player.

Career
At age 14, he was crowned champion in the ACDP Zoo Juniors tournament. In 2017, Trueno became champion of the Crossing of Champions competition. In 2018, he participated in the FMS Argentina competition, where he finished in last place. On 21 October 2019, Trueno was crowned national champion of Red Bull's Batalla de los Gallos Argentina freestyle competition. At the end of that year, Trueno managed to finish in the first position of the FMS Argentina competition. On 23 July 2020, he released his debut album called Atrevido. The song "Mamichula", in collaboration with Nicki Nicole and Bizarrap, was positioned in the first place of the Argentina Hot 100 list of Billboard. In just over a month, the official video for the song surpassed 100,000,000 views on YouTube.

He worked alongside various artists, such as Planet Hemp, Nicki Nicole, Nathy Peluso, Underdann, Bizarrap, Bhavi, Halpe, Wos, XOVOX, C. Terrible, Shaolin Monkeys, El Alfa, Noriel, J Balvin, Tiago PZK among others.

Discography

Albums

Studio album

Live albums

Singles

As a lead artist

As a featuring artist

Other charted songs

Personal life
Trueno has shown his great love of football, his favorite team is Boca Juniors, one of Argentina's biggest and most important sports clubs and the main club in his home neighbourhood. Even the music video for the song "Ñeri" was recorded at the La Bombonera stadium, where Boca Juniors plays. Since mid-2020, Trueno has been in a relationship with Argentine singer Nicki Nicole.

References

Argentine rappers
Argentine trap musicians
Latin trap musicians
2002 births
Living people
People from Buenos Aires